Hamudi Brick (born March 19, 1978) is a former Arab-Israeli footballer.

External links 
 Profile and statistics of Hamudi Brick on One.co.il 

1978 births
Living people
Arab citizens of Israel
Arab-Israeli footballers
Israeli footballers
Maccabi Kafr Kanna F.C. players
Maccabi Netanya F.C. players
Bnei Sakhnin F.C. players
Hapoel Acre F.C. players
Ahva Arraba F.C. players
Liga Leumit players
Israeli Premier League players
Association football defenders